A list of bands distributed by SPV GmbH records either on house labels or through distribution deals.



A
 Ace Frehley
 Adaro
 Albert Hammond
 Al Di Meola
 The Amorettes
 Amplifier
 Angra
 Annihilator
 Arena
 Atrocity
 Axel Rudi Pell
 Ayreon

B
 Bad Religion
 Beyond Fear
 Biohazard
 Blackfield
 Blackmore's Night
 B L A Z E
 Böhse Onkelz
 Borknagar
 Brainstorm
 Brazen Abbot
 Bush (Europe)

C
 Calvin Russell (musician)
 Chandeen
 Chassalla
 Chris de Burgh
 Chris Farlowe
 Chris Spedding
 ChthoniC
 Company of Snakes
 Covenant
 Cradle of Filth

D
 Demons and Wizards
 Die Verbannten Kinder Evas
 Doro
 Dreadful Shadows
 Dry Kill Logic

E
 Edenbridge
 Enslaved
 Eric Burdon
 Evergrey
 Evildead

F
 Fields of the Nephilim
 Freedom Call

G
 Gamma Ray
 Glyder (band)
 Grip Inc.

H
 Hammercult
 Nina Hagen
 Hatesphere
 Helloween
 Hirax

I
 Iced Earth
 Illnath

J
 Jag Panzer

K
 Kamelot
 Kill Devil Hill
 Kreator

L
 Lucyfire

M
 Mad Max
 Magnum
 Metal Church
 Monster Magnet
 Moonspell
 Motörhead
 Michael Schenker
 Michael Schenker Group
 Mucky Pup

O
 The Other

P
 Popol Vuh
 Pro-Pain

Q
 The Quireboys

R
 Rhapsody of Fire
 Ravens Creed

S
 Saga
 Sara Noxx
 Saxon
 Sepultura
 Shadowkeep
 Skinny Puppy
 Sodom
 Stream of Passion
 Summoning
 Solar Fake

T
 Theatres des Vampires
 Tokyo Blade
 Tristania
 Type O Negative

U
 Unleashed

V
 Vardis
 Vintersorg
 Virgin Steele
 Vicious Rumors

W
 Whitesnake

Z
 Zebrahead

References

SPV, Distributed by